Mellerayor Mellaray may refer to:

 Melleray, Sarthe, a commune of the Sarthe département in France
 La Meilleraye-de-Bretagne, a commune of the Loire-Atlantique département in France
 Melleray Abbey, in La Meilleraye-de-Bretagne
 Mount Melleray Abbey, on the slopes of the Knockmealdown Mountains, near Cappoquin, Waterford
 Mount Melleray
 New Melleray Abbey, near Dubuque, Iowa